The Bradenton Juice were a short-lived minor league baseball team based in Bradenton, Florida in 2007. The team's name came from a "Name the Team" contest that included over 100 suggestions for the ball club. The club played in the South Coast League. The Juice's home game were held at Robert C. Wynn Baseball Field, which is located on the campus of Manatee Community College, now State College of Florida, Manatee–Sarasota. However the Juice were no longer permitted to use the field after just four home games into the season.

Juice games were broadcast on WSRQ 1220AM radio in Sarasota/Bradenton, FL. 

During the Juice's lone season, pitcher Brian Gartley went 10-3 with 96 strikeouts to win the Most Outstanding Pitcher award. On March 31, 2008, the League office issued an announcement that it was suspending operations as of April 1, citing an inability to close on a large amount of debt. While the statement claimed that it planned to resume operations in 2009, however the league never returned. The Juice dissolved with the league, as a result.

2007 season

References

Defunct minor league baseball teams
2007 establishments in Florida
2007 disestablishments in Florida
Baseball teams established in 2007
Sports in Bradenton, Florida
South Coast League teams
Baseball teams disestablished in 2007
Defunct independent baseball league teams
Defunct baseball teams in Florida